Affinity is the second EP by English alternative rock band, Press to Meco. Released on 27 May 2013, the extended play was recorded at The Ranch Production House with Neil Kennedy – who would go on to produce the band's debut album, Good Intent. Three songs from the EP – "Tired Bones", "Honestly" and title track, "Affinity" – would also later be re-recorded for inclusion on Good Intent.

Track listing

Personnel
Press to Meco
 Luke Caley – guitar, vocals
 Adam Roffey – bass, vocals
 Lewis Williams – drums, vocals

Additional personnel
 Neil D. Kennedy – producer, mixing
 Jim Harding – assistant engineer
 Robin Schmidt – mastering
 Andreu Mariner – artwork

References 

2013 EPs
Press to Meco albums